Curt "Curre" Lindström (born 26 November 1940) is a Swedish ice hockey coach.

Career on international level
He coached Team Finland from 1993 to 1997, winning Finland's first Ice Hockey World Championships gold medal in 1995, and a silver world championships medal as well as Olympic bronze. He has won the same medals in coaching duties with Team Sweden, and has also coached the Latvian national men's ice hockey team.

Career on club level
Lindström stepped in to coach Ilves in the Finnish SM-liiga in the 2004–2005 season after a disappointing start to the season, and led the team to the quarterfinals, where they were beaten by Jokerit. In November 2005, Lindström was hired as a new head coach to Jokerit after the team had a miserable early season under former player and rookie coach Waltteri Immonen. Jokerit were left out of Play Offs at the end of the season. His contract was only for the remainder of the 2005–2006 season, so he left his place as head coach before the start of 2006–2007 season.

Coaching style
Lindström is known as one of the finest motivators in international levels. Some critics say that he is not as tactically talented as he is verbally.

Coaching Awards and honours
head coach
 World Championship (1): 1987, 1995
 Winter Olympics  (1): 1994
 World Championship (2): 1986, 1994
 Izvestia Tournament  (2): 1994, 1996
Assistant coach

 Canada Cup (1): 1984

References

Swedish ice hockey coaches
1940 births
Living people
Latvia men's national ice hockey team coaches
Finland men's national ice hockey team coaches